Masana may refer to:

Masana language
Bokuzō Masana
Javier Masana
Gerardo Masana
Masana Miyamoto